BMW is a German automobile manufacturer.

BMW may also refer to:
Bomwali language's ISO language code
Best Man Wins, a 1948 film
Boy Meets World, an American television series
H E Tancred Stakes, an Australian horse race formerly known as "The BMW"
"BMW", a 2022 song by Bad Boy Chiller Crew
Biodegradable municipal waste